The 2005 New Zealand Music Awards took place on 5 October 2005 at the Aotea Centre in Auckland.

Awards and nominees
The 'Lifetime Achievement Award' category was changed to 'Outstanding Contribution to the Growth in NZ Music on Radio'.

One new category was added: 'Best Roots Album'.

The Best Maori Album and Best Gospel / Christian Album categories were not awarded due to insufficient entries.

Winners are listed first and highlighted in boldface.

Multiple winners on the night included Fat Freddy's Drop with five awards.

Key
 – Non-technical award
 – Technical award

References

New Zealand Music Awards
Music Awards
Aotearoa Music Awards
October 2005 events in New Zealand